Iain D. Thomson (born 1968) is an American philosopher and Professor of Philosophy at the University of New Mexico (UNM).  He is a well-known expert on Martin Heidegger.

Education and career
Thomson studied as an undergraduate at the University of California, Berkeley, where he worked with Hubert Dreyfus, and then earned his Ph.D. in philosophy at the University of California, San Diego. As a visiting graduate student at UC Irvine, he also studied with Jacques Derrida.  He is known for his expertise on Heidegger's philosophy, philosophy of education, philosophy of technology, philosophy of art, philosophy of literature and environmental philosophy.

Thomson received a National Endowment for the Humanities Research Fellowship and UNM College of Arts and Sciences' Gunter Starkey Teaching Award in 2003. He is featured in Tao Ruspoli's film Being in the World. His articles on Heidegger have been published in such journals as Inquiry, Journal of the History of Philosophy, The Harvard Review of Philosophy, the International Journal of Philosophical Studies, and the Journal of the British Society for Phenomenology.

Books
 Heidegger, Art, and Postmodernity, Cambridge University Press, 2011, 
 Heidegger on Ontotheology: Technology and the Politics of Education, Cambridge University Press, 2005,

See also
Ontotheology
The Origin of the Work of Art
Hubert Dreyfus
Martin Heidegger

References

External links
 The UNM Faculty Homepage of Iain Thomson
 An interview with Thomson on his book Heidegger on Ontotheology: Technology and the Politics of Education

21st-century American philosophers
Phenomenologists
Continental philosophers
Political philosophers
Environmental philosophers
Philosophers of art
Philosophers of culture
Philosophers of education
Philosophers of technology
Philosophers from New Mexico
Existentialists
Philosophy academics
Heidegger scholars
Living people
1968 births
University of New Mexico faculty
University of California, San Diego alumni
University of California, Berkeley alumni